Maureen Payne was a South African cricketer who played as a slow left-arm orthodox bowler. She appeared in five Test matches for South Africa between 1960 and 1972, including captaining the side in their series against New Zealand. She played domestic cricket for Western Province.

References

External links
 
 

Year of birth missing
1997 deaths
Place of birth missing
South African women cricketers
South Africa women Test cricketers
South Africa women's national cricket team captains
Western Province women cricketers
20th-century South African women